Doug Lapwood is a former association football player who represented New Zealand at international level.

Lapwood made his full All Whites debut in a 3–2 loss to Australia on 18 August 1958 and ended his international playing career with five A-international caps to his credit, his final cap an appearance in a 2–1 win over New Caledonia on 14 September 1958.

References 

Year of birth missing (living people)
Living people
New Zealand association footballers
New Zealand international footballers
Association footballers not categorized by position